The Commonwealth Fencing Championships is a fencing event held in the Commonwealth of Nations. Following the removal of fencing as a core sport within the main Commonwealth Games, the first Commonwealth Fencing Championships were held in 1974 and they have been held in the same cycle as the Commonwealth Games ever since.  The Championships are managed by Commonwealth Fencing Federation.

Hosts

Commonwealth Champions

Foil

Sabre

Epee

External links
 Commonwealth Fencing Federation
 Commonwealth Fencing Championships 2014 
 Commonwealth Fencing Championships 2010

References

Fencing
C